The following are lists of publishing companies.

By language
List of English-language book publishing companies
List of English-language literary presses
List of English-language small presses
List of Romanian-language publishers
List of Urdu language book publishing companies

Others
List of publishing companies of Albania
List of British entomological publishers
List of comics publishing companies
List of Golden Age comics publishers
List of publishing companies of Estonia
List of manga publishers
List of manhua publishers
List of largest book publishers of the United Kingdom
List of pornographic book publishers
List of publishers of children's books
List of science fiction publishers
List of self-publishing companies
List of UK children's book publishers
List of publishing companies of Ukraine
List of university presses
List of video game publishers
List of women's presses

See also
List of book distributors